Bushkill Creek (Dutch for "bushy" or "forest creek") is a  tributary of the Delaware River in the Lehigh Valley region of eastern Pennsylvania.

A portion of Bushkill Creek passes through the Jacobsburg Environmental Education Center. The confluence with the Delaware River is in Easton.

The stream was historically named Lafever Creek, Lefebres Creek, Lefevres Creek, Lefrever Creek, Leheihan Creek, Lehieton Creek, Tatamys Creek, Tatemy's Creek, or Tattamys Creek.

The stream has brought tourism to the region by Bushkill Falls located in the Pocono Mountains.

See also
List of Pennsylvania rivers
List of Delaware River tributaries

References

External links
DCNR page for Jacobsburg Environmental Education Center
USGS Geographic Names Information System Feature Detail Report
U.S. Geological Survey: PA stream gaging stations

Rivers of Pennsylvania
Tributaries of the Delaware River
Rivers of Northampton County, Pennsylvania